FrameGang was an applet for developing HTML frames for Netscape released by Sausage Software in April 1996. The program featured a drag-and-drop interface that allowed users to define the number, size and position of the HTML frames without knowledge of HTML. It was one of the four "snaglets" along with Crosseye, Flash, and Clickette that were released by Sausage Software that month.

FrameGang used non-standard HTML tags which were meant to be used with Netscape, and thus not all browsers were able to use the frames created.

FrameGang is no longer for sale by Sausage Software.

Features
FrameGang could handle multiple frames, allowed previewing and saving of the frames, and generated HTML code for the frames which could then be used in HotDog. FrameGang allowed for the development of frames without knowledge of html. The program was also accompanied with help features and tutorials on building frames.

FrameGang was considered an "addon" to Sausage Software's popular HotDog Professional 2.0 which didn't have frame support.

Reception
FrameGang was well received and was recommended in PC/Computing magazine's list of "1,001 Top Free Internet Downloads" for 1997.

It was also praised for its ease of use and in-depth tutorials on HTML frames.

FrameGang was recommended for those using Netscape Navigator Gold 3 which didn't yet support frame development even though the Netscape Navigator browser did support frames.

Frame Gang

The frame gang is used in the FrameGang Help file to represent different section graphically. The frame gang consists of 5 members: X, Gus, Vin, Joe, Stan. Several members also had a slogan. 

 Gus-Represents "advanced information". Slogan: I'm Gus...look at me when I'm talkin!
 Vin- Shown in the splash screen, and used in the icon.
 Joe - Represents the "basic information" about FrameGang. Slogan: I'm Joe...whadda you lookin at!
 Stan- Represents "more answers". Slogan: Hello I'm Stan!

When creating new frames, a member of the frame gang would initially fill up that frame.

Editions

FrameGang was a 32-bit application written for Windows 95 released in April 1996. Fourthnet, the European distributor for HotDog, began marketing all of Sausage Software's snaglets including FrameGang in June 1996. A 16-bit version for Windows 3.1 was released on December 17, 1996, along with 16-bit versions of Dummy, Gatling, and Bandwidth Buster. The 32-bit edition originally sold for /, but the price was later reduced to /£25 on May 22, 1996.

FrameGang was also available at tucows.

The editions came with a 14-day evaluation period.

The following dll's are required to run FrameGang:
 RPCRT4.DLL
 MSVCRT20.DLL
 MSVCRT40.DLL
 OLEPRO32.DLL (dated September 29, 1995 or newer)
 OLEAUT32.DLL (dated October 6, 1995 or newer)
 OLE32.DLL
 VB40032.DLL
 MFC40.DLL (dated October 6, 1995 or newer)

System requirements
FrameGang had the following system requirements:
 IBM-Compatible PC
 Processor: 80486 DX 33 or better
 Operating System: Windows 3.1 / 3.11 / 95/ Windows NT 3.51/Windows NT Server 3.51
 Ram: 8MB minimum, 16MB recommended
 Computer mouse

See also
 Frame-IT!
 FrameMaker

Annotations

References

Further reading

External links
 FrameGang Version 1a, The Winsock-L FTP Area
 Accessories/frameg1b.exe FrameGang Version 1b
 FrameGang 1a, SFR Fresh Archive
 Screenshots at flickr

1996 software